Hell Squad may refer to:
 Hell Squad (1958 film), written and directed by Burt Topper
 Hell Squad (1985 film)
 Hell Squad for the Commodore Amiga